Dura Ram is an Indian politician. He was elected to the Haryana Legislative Assembly from Fatehabad in the 2019 Haryana Legislative Assembly election as a member of the Bharatiya Janata Party.  He has an asset of ₹20 Crore.

Career graph
2005 – MLA Fatehabad
2019 – MLA Fatehabad

References 

1959 births
Living people
Bharatiya Janata Party politicians from Haryana
People from Fatehabad district
Haryana MLAs 2019–2024
Indian National Congress politicians
Haryana Janhit Congress politicians